Pimprud is a village located in the Yawal tehsil of the Jalgaon district in Maharashtra state, India.

Geography
Pimprud is a village located in the Yawal tehsil of the Jalgaon district in Maharashtra state, India. 

Pimprud is located at 21.15°N 75.86°E. It has an average elevation of 221 metres (725 feet). 

Village situated on the bank of Dhadi river. The total geographical area of village is 454.73 hectares(4.5473 km²), including Agriculture land.

Demographics
As of 2011 India census, Pimprud had a population of 1,492. Males constitute 51% of the population and females 49%. Out of which nearby 10% of the population is under 6 years of age.

Pimprud has an average literacy rate of 84.80%, higher than the national average of 74.04. Male literacy is 89.84%, and female literacy is 79.55%.

References

Villages in Jalgaon district